Natalie Hannah McCool is an English singer-songwriter and musician. She first became recognised when she won a Yamaha-sponsored national songwriting competition judged by Coldplay frontman Chris Martin. While at university, she received a one-to-one songwriting session with Paul McCartney.

Discography

Studio albums
 The Great Unknown (2016)

References

External links 
 

Year of birth missing (living people)
Living people
People from Whiston, Merseyside
People from Widnes
English women singer-songwriters
English women guitarists
English guitarists
Alumni of the Liverpool Institute for Performing Arts